Noel Thomas Jr. (born September 18, 1994) is a gridiron football wide receiver who is currently a free agent. He was most recently a member of the Ottawa Redblacks of the Canadian Football League (CFL). He played college football at University of Connecticut. He has also been a member of the Detroit Lions (NFL).

High school
Thomas was named New England Preparatory School Athletic Council Class C All-New England and MSG Varsity's Connecticut Player of the Year as a wide receiver, running back and quarterback his senior year for his father's NEPSAC Class C championship St. Lukes team.

College career 
Thomas finished his career at UConn setting the school's single season receptions record with 100 catches for 1,179 yards in 2016.  His 8.3 receptions per game was fifth in the nation and third in the AAC.  Thomas' 183 career receptions was fourth most in school history.  His 2,235 yards was eighth most.

Among Thomas' collegiate accolades:
 Walter Camp Football Foundation Connecticut Player of the Year Award (2016)
  2016 Second-team All-American Athletic Conference (2016)
  All-New England (2015, 2016)
  All-ECAC honors (2016)
  NFLPA Collegiate Bowl participant
  NFL Scouting Combine invitee

Professional career

Detroit Lions 
He signed with the Detroit Lions as an undrafted free agent in 2017. Although he did not initially make the 53-man roster for the start of the season he was added to the Lions practice roster on September 6, 2017. He was not re-signed by the club following the 2017 season.

Ottawa Redblacks 
Thomas signed with the Ottawa Redblacks of the Canadian Football League (CFL) for their 2018 season, and played in five games in his first season catching 12 passes for 151 yards with one touchdown. In his second year in the CFL Thomas played four games with the Redblacks, catching 15 passes for 123 yards. He was released by Ottawa in the middle of the season on August 13, 2019.

References

External links
Detroit Lions bio
UConn Huskies bio
Official Website

1994 births
Living people
American football wide receivers
Canadian football wide receivers
UConn Huskies football players
Detroit Lions players
Ottawa Redblacks players
Players of American football from Connecticut
Sportspeople from Norwalk, Connecticut